The 36th Army Corps was first formed before World War I.

World War 1 
The Corps saw service throughout the entirety of the First World War, including participating in the Battle of Passchendaele as part of the French First Army. At the time of the Battle of Passchendaele, the corps consisted of the 29th Division and the 133rd Division.

Footnotes

References

 

036
Corps of France in World War I